NeuroLex is a lexicon of neuroscience concepts supported by the Neuroscience Information Framework project. It is structured as a semantic wiki, using Semantic MediaWiki.

Overview 
The NeuroLex is intended to help improve the way that neuroscientists communicate about their work by using common and consistent terminologies to enable easy data integration and interpretation across different studies and resources.

Utilization within the Neuroscience Information Framework 
The NIF enables discovery and access to public research data and tools worldwide through an open source, networked environment. Funded by the NIH Blueprint for Neuroscience Research, the NIF allows scientists and students to discover global neuroscience web resources that cut across traditional boundaries – from experimental, clinical and translational neuroscience databases, to knowledge bases, atlases, and genetic/genomic resources.

NIF provides deeper access to a more focused set of resources that are relevant to neuroscience, search strategies tailored to the field, and access to content that is traditionally “hidden” from web search engines.  The Framework is an inventory of neuroscience databases, annotated and integrated with a unified system of biomedical terminology (i.e. NeuroLex). NIF supports concept-based queries across multiple scales of biological structure and multiple levels of biological function, making it easier to search for and understand the results.

As part of the NIF, a search interface to many different sources of neuroscience information and data is provided.  To make this search more effective, the NIF is constructing ontologies to help organize neuroscience concepts into category hierarchies, e.g. stating that a neuron is a cell. This allows users to perform more effective searches and also to organize and understand the information that is returned.  But an important adjunct to this activity is to clearly define all of the terms that are used to describe data.

Content 
The initial entries in the NeuroLex were built from the NIFSTD ontologies which subsumed an earlier vocabulary BIRNLex.  It currently contains concepts that span gross anatomy, cells of the nervous system, subcellular structures, diseases, functions and techniques. NIF is soliciting community input to add more content and correct what is there.

See also

 NeuroNames
 Neuroscience Information Framework

Notes and references

Further reading 

NIF was featured in a special issue of Neuroinformatics, published in September 2008:

External links

NeuroLex site
Neuroscience Information Framework (NIF) website
National Institutes of Health NIF website
Bioinformatics resources in NeuroLex

MediaWiki websites
Semantic wikis
Neuroscience software
Ontology (information science)
Anatomical terminology
Anatomy websites
Biological databases